Melres is a town and a former civil parish in the municipality of Gondomar, Portugal. In 2013, the parish merged into the new parish Melres e Medas.

References

Former parishes of Gondomar, Portugal
Towns in Portugal